Alicia Balicoco Barker (born May 22, 1998) is an American-Filipino footballer who plays as a defender for Pacific Northwest SC and the Philippines women's national team.

College career

University of Illinois Urbana-Champaign
Barker played collegiate soccer at University of Illinois Urbana-Champaign in NCAA Division I.

International career
Barker is eligible to represent either United States or Philippines at the international level.

Philippines
In December 2022, Barker was included in the Philippines squad for the national team's training camp in Australia. She made her debut for the Philippines in a 5–1 friendly win against Papua New Guinea.

References

1998 births
Living people
Citizens of the Philippines through descent
Filipino women's footballers
Women's association football defenders
Philippines women's international footballers
American women's soccer players
Illinois Fighting Illini women's soccer players
American people of Filipino descent
American sportspeople of Filipino descent